The International Army Games is an annual international military sports event organized by the Ministry of Defence (MoD) of Russia. The event, which was first staged in August 2015, involves close to 30 countries taking part in dozens of competitions over two weeks to prove which is the most skilled. The games have been referred to as the War Olympics. In addition to the competition, the International Army Games includes a military theme park, a recruitment station, and souvenir shops.

History 

 2015 International Army Games - Took place in Russia from August 1–15, 2015.
 2016 International Army Games - Took place from July 30 to August 13, 2016. 3,500 servicemen from 19 states fought in 23 competitions.
 2017 International Army Games - Was held from July 29 to August 12 in 5 countries: Russia, China, Azerbaijan, Belarus, and Kazakhstan. During the games 28 international competitions were held, including 5 new ones. 
 2018 International Army Games - Was held from July 28 to August 11, 2018. The competitions were held in Armenia and Iran for the first time. Teams from Algeria, Vietnam, Myanmar, Pakistan, the Sudan and the Philippines also took part in the games for the first time.
 2019 International Army Games - Was planned to be organized in 32 disciplines hosted in 10 countries starting on August 3, 2019 in Korla. Russia, India, China, Azerbaijan, Armenia, Belarus, Iran, Mongolia, Uzbekistan and Kazakhstan are the countries hosting it. India hosted and won Stage 2 of the games, known as the 5th International Army Scout Masters Competition. Uzbekistan came second and Russia fourth.
2020 International Army Games- Was held from August 22 to September 5, 2020. Russia won the competition while Belarus was second and Uzbekistan was third.
2021 International Army Games- Was held from August 22 to September 4, 2021.

Editions

Competitions 

 Tank biathlon
 Suvorov Attack ("Suvorov Onslaught"): competition between crews/specialists of infantry combat vehicles
 Aviadarts: competition for flight crews 
 Masters of artillery fire: artillery calculation competition
 Clear skies: competition among anti-aircraft units
 Excellence troop intelligence: competition between intelligence departments
 Open water: competition among dispatching units
 Safe route: competition among engineering units
 Safe environment: radiation, chemical and biological defense forces' competition
 International Army Scout Masters' Competition

2020 Events

Hosts:

Russia
Iran
India
Mongolia
Kazakhstan
Uzbekistan
Armenia
Azerbaijan
Belarus
China

Events:

Tank Biathlon = Tank Crews Competition
Suvorov Attack = Ifvs' Crews Competition
Sniper Frontier = Snipers Competition
Aviadarts = Flight Crews Competition
Airborne Platoon = Airborne Forces Platoons Competition
Seaborne Assaul = Naval Infantry Units Competition
Sea Cup = Combat Ship Crews Competition
Depth = Divers Multidiscipline Competition
Masters Of Artillery Fire = Mortar Battery Squads Competition
Gunsmith Master = Maintenance Platoons Competition
Clear Sky = Ad Units Competition
Confident Reception = Competition Of Anti-Aircraft Missile Troops Units
Army Scout Masters = Army Reconnaissance Units Competition
Open Water = Pontoon Bridge Crews Competition
Safe Route = Combat Engineering Units Competition
Engineering Formula = Engineering Units Competition
Safe Environment = NBC Reconnaissance Crews Competition
Masters Of Armored Vehicles = Armored Vehicles Crews Competition
Elbrus Ring = Mountain Infantry Units Competition
True Friend = Dog Handlers Competition
Military Medical Relay Race = Medical Staff Competition
Field Kitchen = Food Service Specialists Competition
Guardian Of Order = Military Police Competition
Military Rally = Armored Vehicles Crews Competition
Warrior Of Peace = International Competition Of Military-Professional Servicemen Skills
Falcon Hunting = Uavs' Crews Competition
Road Patrol = Military Police Officers Competition
Emergency Area = Competition Among Emergency Rescue Units
Equestrian Marathon = Competition Among Horse Mounted Units
Polar Star = Special Operation Units Competition

Participants 
Note: O = Observer

For the first time, Bolivia and Rwanda participated in the 2022 Games.

Greece was the only NATO member state that has officially participated in the games. Since 2020, three largely-unrecognised countries have participated.

Russian groups in opening and closing ceremonies

Alexandrov Ensemble
Central Military Band of the Ministry of Defense of Russia
154th Preobrazhensky Independent Commandant's Regiment
Belarusian Armed Forces Academic Song and Dance Ensemble

Gallery

See also 

 World Military Championships
 World Military Cup
 Africa Military Games
 Invictus Games
 Military World Games
 World Police and Fire Games
 Exercise RIMPAC

References

External links 
 
 https://interfiresport.com/
 https://interfiresport.com/activity/
 http://firefighterchallenge.com/
 https://www.firefighterchampionships.com/
 https://www.firefighterchampionships.com/?post_type=tribe_events
 https://www.tcpalm.com/story/news/local/st-lucie-county/2021/10/04/fort-pierce-hosts-2021-firefighter-combat-challenge-world-championship-st-lucie-defends-title-espn/8418203002/

Military sports competitions
Multi-sport events
Recurring sporting events established in 2015
Annual sporting events